Doña Casilda Iturrizar Park is a public park located in the city of Bilbao (Basque Autonomous Community, Spain), in the central neighbourhood of Indautxu. It is named after Casilda Iturrizar (1818 – 1900), who donated the land and was a prominent philanthropist in the city.

Until a few years ago, it was the only green space in the city. It features an English-style garden created more than 100 years ago, which highlights the perfectly preserved examples of many centenary tree species.

Attractions

Within the park there is a duck pond with various species of waterfowl; the park is nicknamed Parque de los Patos (Duck's park) by the locals because of this pond.

There is also a cybernetic fountain that offers sound and light shows during the holidays, surrounded by a shaded walkway (called a pergola) as well as a large space where concerts can be held.

History
The park lost ground during the 20th century, the Bilbao Fine Arts Museum was constructed entirely inside the park and  the so-called park road, a four lane access to the city centre, was created in the northern edge of the park. 

More recently, since 2006, the Abandoibarra project has allowed the park to enhance the green area, by removing the park road and enlarging the park over the former shipyards of Euskalduna. The park remains the main green space of the city, although it is no longer the only one.

Geography of Bilbao
Parks in Spain
Tourist attractions in Bilbao